St. Leo is an unincorporated community in southwestern Kingman County, Kansas, United States.  It is six miles north of K-42.  St. Leo features a Catholic church and has an active parish community.  Its ZIP Code is 67112, and area code is 620.

Geography
The statistics of St. Leo are as follows: elevation is 1759 feet, latitude is 37° 31′ 45″N, longitude is 98° 24′ 37″W.

Education
The community is served by Cunningham–West Kingman County USD 332 public school district.

References

Further reading

External links
 Kingman County maps: Current, Historic, KDOT

Unincorporated communities in Kingman County, Kansas
Unincorporated communities in Kansas